Johan Decavele (born 1943) is a Belgian historian and archivist who has published widely on the history of Ghent and on the history of the Reformation. He was a contributor to the Oxford Encyclopedia of the Reformation and to Oxford Art Online.

Life
Decavele was born in Tielt in 1943 and studied history at the universities of Leuven and Mainz. His doctoral thesis at Leuven, on the early Reformation in Flanders, was a prize-winning dissertation published by the Royal Flemish Academy of Belgium for Science and the Arts as De dageraad van de Reformatie in Vlaanderen (Brussels, 1975). He quickly found work as city archivist in Ghent, where he would eventually become head of the city's department of culture in 2003. He retired in 2005.

Works
Johan Decavele, De dageraad van de reformatie in Vlaanderen (1520-1565) (Brussels, 1975)
Johan Decavele, Panoramisch gezicht op Gent in 1534 (Brussels, 1975)
Johan Decavele, Honderdvijftig jaar Kanaal Gent-Terneuzen (Ghent, 1977)
Johan Decavele, Britten en Amerikanen in Gent: Het vredesverdrag van 1814 (Ghent, 1979)
Johan Decavele, Georgette Caese and J. Coppens, Gent oud Vlaendren: wereld-tentoonstelling, 1913 (Ghent, 1983)
Johan Decavele and Johan Vannieuwenhuyse, Stadsarchief van Gent. Archiefgids 1: Oud archief (Ghent, 1983)
Johan Decavele, Vlaanderen tussen Spanje en Oranje: Willem de Zwijger en de Lage Landen in de zestiende eeuw (Ghent, 1984)
Johan Decavele and André Capiteyn, Franse franje naar Gentse maat: de burgerbouwkunst te Gent in de 18de eeuw (Ghent, 1984)
Johan Decavele and Dirk Coigneau, Het eind van een rebelse droom: opstellen over het calvinistisch bewind te Gent (1577-1584) en de terugkeer van de stad onder de gehoorzaamheid van de koning van Spanje (17 september 1584) (Ghent, 1984)
Johan Decavele, Gent: historisch hart van Vlaanderen (Ghent, 1985)
Johan Decavele, Gent: een stad van stoere vitaliteit en artistieke verfijning, geschraagd door de culturele erfenis van een rijk verleden (Ghent, 1986)
Johan Decavele, Het toreken op de Vrijdagmarkt te Gent (Ghent, 1986)
Johan Decavele, Poorters en buitenpoorters van Gent: 1477-1492, 1542-1796 (Ghent, 1986)
Johan Decavele (ed.), Ghent: In Defence of a Rebellious City: History, Art, Culture (Antwerp, 1989)
Johan Decavele, Vlaanderen (Ghent, 1990)
Johan Decavele and Jozef Bontinck, Gebuurteleven en dekenijen te Gent 14de-20ste eeuw (Ghent, 1992)
Johan Vannieuwenhuyse and Johan Decavele, Stadsarchief Gent 175 jaar (Ghent, 1992)
Johan Decavele and Johan Vannieuwenhuyse, Hoe functioneert het Archief in de administratie en bij het bestuur van de gemeente? (Ghent, 1993)
André Capiteyn and Johan Decavele, De Gentse Feesten: biografie van een 150 jarig monument (Ghent, 1993)
Johan Decavele and Freddy Decreus, Hugo Claus 65 (Ghent, 1994)
Johan Decavele, Gentenaars stropdragers (Ghent, 1995)
Johan Decavele and André Capiteyn, 1350 jaar Gent, de Gentenaars en hun rijke verleden (Zwolle, 1997)
Johan Decavele, 1350 jaar Gent, de Gentenaars en hun bestuurders (Zwolle, 1999)
Johan Decavele, Gent: stad van keizer Karel (Brussels, 1999)
Paul Pas and Johan Decavele, De Gentse Sint-Baafsabdij en haar dorp (Heusden, 1999)
Luc Lekens and Johan Decavele, Het Campo Santo in 131 levensverhalen (Ghent, 2001)
Johan Decavele, Heiligendevotie in het bisdom Gent (Ghent, 2009)
Johan Decavele and Herman Balthazar, Het geheugen van Nederland in Gent (Ghent, 2011)
Jozef Scheerder, Johan Decavele and Gustaaf Janssens, Het wonderjaar te Gent, 1566-1567 (Ghent, 2016)
Johan Decavele, Zevenhonderdvijftig jaar begijnenbeweging: Onze-Lieve-Vrouw ter Hoyen in Gent (Ghent, 2016)

References

1943 births
20th-century Belgian historians
Belgian archivists
Living people
21st-century Belgian historians